Diplodactylus platyurus, sometimes called the eastern fat-tailed gecko, is a gecko endemic to Australia.

It is found in Queensland and South Australia.

References

Diplodactylus
Reptiles described in 1926
Taxa named by Hampton Wildman Parker
Geckos of Australia